John Gale  (born 2 August 1929) is an English theatrical producer and artistic director.

Life 
Gale was born 2 August 1929, the son of Frank Haith Gale and Martha Edith Gale (née Evans). He attended Christ’s Hospital and the Webber Douglas Academy of Dramatic Art. In 1950, he married Liselotte Ann Wratten and they have two sons. He was originally an actor until he produced Inherit the Wind in London in 1960.

He was the producer of the long-running West End comedy No Sex Please, We're British, which ran at three different West End theatres from 1971-87.

He succeeded Patrick Garland as the sixth artistic director of the Chichester Festival Theatre in 1985. He directed five Festival seasons until 1989.

In 1986 Gale was executive producer for the Chichester Festival Theatre's first London revival of Irving Berlin's musical Annie Get Your Gun, starring Suzi Quatro as Annie Oakley and Eric Flynn as Frank Butler.

Gale was executive producer on the 1993 recording of Robert & Elizabeth (Chichester Festival Cast).

He was appointed OBE in the 1987 New Year Honours.

References

External links

Living people
1929 births
English theatre managers and producers
Officers of the Order of the British Empire
People educated at Christ's Hospital
Alumni of the Webber Douglas Academy of Dramatic Art